Ramotswa station/Taung is a town in South-East District of Botswana, southwest of the capital of Gaborone. The population was 4,250 in 2011 census.

References

Populated places in Botswana
South-East District (Botswana)